Gwale is a Local Government Area in Kano State, Nigeria within Greater population and surface area at the center of the Kano city. Its headquarters are in the suburb of Gwale around the Kofar Na’isa Area.

It has an area of 18 km and a population of 362,059 at the 2006 census.

The postal code of the area is 700234. Gwale has many inhabitants, especially Islamic scholars. Malam Aminu Kano was born at Sudawa Quarters, Gwale Local Government.

Prominent Indigenous Personalities
Aminu Kano

References

Local Government Areas in Kano State